Buttercups and Daisies is a 1931 comedy novel by the British writer Compton Mackenzie.

References

Bibliography
 David Joseph Dooley. Compton Mackenzie. Twayne Publishers, 1974.
 Andro Linklater. Compton Mackenzie: A Life Hogarth Press, 1992.

1931 British novels
Novels by Compton Mackenzie
British comedy novels